Edmund De Wind,  (11 December 1883 – 21 March 1918) was a British Army officer during the First World War, and posthumous recipient of the Victoria Cross, the highest and most prestigious award for gallantry in the face of the enemy that can be awarded to British and Commonwealth forces.

Both his native Northern Ireland and his adopted home of Canada count De Wind amongst the men of their militaries who have earned the VC.

Background
De Wind was born in Comber, County Down, Ireland on 11 December 1883 to Arthur Hughes De Wind, C.E., and Margaret Jane De Wind. He was educated at Campbell College and then went to work for the Bank of Ireland, Clones branch.

De Wind was living in Canada in 1914 and working for the Edmonton branch of the CIBC when World War I broke out.  He served with The Queen's Own Rifles of Canada for a period of six months prior to his enlistment as a private on 16 November 1914 in the 31st Battalion-Alberta Regiment, Canadian Overseas Expeditionary Force. He arrived in France with 2nd Division of C.E.F. in September 1915. He saw action in the Battle of the Somme (1916) and at Vimy Ridge (1917). He earned a commission in September 1917 in the British Army.

Victoria Cross
As a 34-year-old Second Lieutenant in the 15th Battalion, The Royal Irish Rifles, he was awarded the VC for deeds committed during the 1918 Spring Offensive on 21 March 1918. He died on that day.

Commemoration

De Wind is commemorated by a pillar, bearing his name and date of death, commissioned by his mother and installed at the main entrance on the west front of St Anne's Cathedral, Belfast. The entire west front, dedicated in 1927, forms a memorial to the Ulster men and women who served and died in the Great War. He is also named on the Pozières Memorial, in the Somme department of France, to the missing of the Fifth Army. There is a plaque memorial in his old school, Campbell College, Belfast. In his home town of Comber, he is commemorated by an Ulster History Circle blue plaque, unveiled in 2007.

Mount De Wind, Alberta, Canada, is named after him. A housing estate in Comber is also named in his honour.

See also
List of Canadian Victoria Cross recipients

References

Further reading 
Listed in order of publication year 
The Register of the Victoria Cross (1981, 1988 and 1997)

Ireland's VCs (Dept of Economic Development, 1995)
Monuments to Courage (David Harvey, 1999)
Irish Winners of the Victoria Cross (Richard Doherty & David Truesdale, 2000)

External links
Edmund de Wind's digitized service file (CEF)
Canadian Mountain Encyclopedia - Mount De Wind
Edmund De Wind on Legion Magazine

1883 births
1918 deaths
People from Alberta
People from Comber
People educated at Campbell College
Canadian people of Irish descent
Canadian people of Anglo-Irish descent
British Army personnel of World War I
Royal Ulster Rifles officers
Irish Battle of the Somme recipients of the Victoria Cross
Canadian World War I recipients of the Victoria Cross
Irish emigrants to Canada (before 1923)
British military personnel killed in World War I
Queen's Own Rifles of Canada soldiers
Canadian military personnel of World War I
Military personnel from County Down
Canadian Expeditionary Force soldiers
British Army recipients of the Victoria Cross
Irish World War I recipients of the Victoria Cross